Scopula internata is a moth of the  family Geometridae. It is found in the Democratic Republic of Congo, Gambia, Kenya, Malawi, South Africa, Tanzania, Uganda and Zambia.

Subspecies
Scopula internata internata (South Africa, Gambia)
Scopula internata praeruptorum Prout, 1920 (Democratic Republic of Congo, Kenya, Tanzania, Uganda)

References

Moths described in 1858
internata
Moths of Africa